Pipiza quadrimaculata is a species of hoverfly, from the family Syrphidae, in the order Diptera.

References

External links

Diptera of Europe
Diptera of North America
Hoverflies of North America
Pipizinae
Insects described in 1804
Taxa named by Georg Wolfgang Franz Panzer